Steinberger See is a lake in Bavaria, Germany. At an elevation of 364 m, its surface area is 1.84 km². Situated in SSE Germany, It is home to its own water skiing place.

References 
http://www.wildwakeski.de/

Lakes of Bavaria